The 1920–21 Hong Kong First Division season was the 13th since its establishment.

Overview
Wiltshire Regiment won the title.

References
RSSSF

Hong Kong First Division League seasons
Hong Kong First Division League
1920 in Hong Kong
1921 in Hong Kong
Hong Kong
Hong Kong